Dewsnip is a surname. Notable people with the surname include:

George Dewsnip (born 1956), English footballer
Neil Dewsnip, English football and manager